Walker is an occupational male given name, deriving from the English term for "cloth washer". It was first recorded in the Middle Ages.

Notable people with the name "Walker" include

A
Walker Anderson (1801–1857), American politician
Walker Keith Armistead (1783–1845), American military officer
Walker Lee Ashley (born 1960), American football player

B
Walker Banks (born 1947), American politician
Walker Blaine (1855–1890), American politician
Walker Bleakney (1901–1992), American physicist
Walker Boone (1944–2021), Canadian actor
Walker Brooke (1813–1869), American politician
Walker Buehler (born 1994), American baseball player
Walker Butler (1898–1969), American jurist and politician

C
Walker O. Cain (1915–1993), American architect
Walker Calhoun (1918–2012), American musician
Walker Carpenter (1893–1956), American football player
Walker Lee Cisler (1897–1994), American engineer
Walker Connor (1926–2017), American political scientist
Walker Cooper (1915–1991), American baseball player
Walker Cress (1917–1996), American baseball player
Walker M. Curtiss (1852–1917), American politician

D
Walker Rannie Davidson (1808–1876), Australian surveyor
Walker Duehr (born 1997), American ice hockey player

E
Walker Edmiston (1926–2007), American actor
Walker Ellis (1895–1974), English cricketer
Walker Evans (1903–1975), American photographer
Walker Evans (racing driver) (born 1938), American racing driver

F
Walker Fearn (1832–1899), American general
Walker Américo Frônio (born 1982), Brazilian footballer

G
Walker Gillette (born 1947), American football player

H
Walker Hamilton (1934–1969), Scottish writer
Walker Hampson (1889–1959), English footballer
Walker Hancock (1901–1998), American sculptor
Walker Hayes (born 1979), American singer
Walker Hines (1870–1934), American railroad executive
Walker Hines (politician) (born 1984), American businessman and politician
Walker Hume (born 1993), American soccer player

K
Walker Kessler (born 2001), American basketball player
Walker King (1751–1827), English churchman
Walker King (priest) (1798–1958), English archdeacon

L
Walker Lambiotte (born 1967), American basketball player
Walker Leach (1888–1944), American football player
Walker Lewis (1798–1856), American abolitionist
Walker Little (born 1999), American football player
Walker Lockett (born 1994), American baseball player
Walker Lukens, American singer-songwriter

M
Walker McCall (born 1954), Scottish footballer
Walker David Miller (1939–2013), American judge

P
Walker Percy (1916–1990), American author
Walker Powell (1828–1915), Canadian businessman and politician

R
Walker Railey (born 1947), American minister
Walker Reynolds (1888–1977), American football player
Walker Russell (born 1960), American basketball player
Walker Russell Jr. (born 1982), American basketball player

S
Walker Smith (disambiguation), multiple people
Walker Stapleton (born 1974), American politician

T
Walker T (born 1978), Jamaican singer
Walker Thomas (born 1963), American politician
Walker Todd (1786–1840), American lawyer and politician

V
Walker Whiting Vick (1878–1926), American politician

W
Walker Wainwright (1882–1961), English cricketer
Walker Whiteside (1869–1942), American actor
Walker Wood (1874–1957), American journalist and politician

Z
Walker Zimmerman (born 1993), American soccer player

See also
Walker (surname)
Walker (disambiguation)
Walker (taxonomic authority)

References

English masculine given names
English given names